Veikko Oskari Ville Salminen (2 October 1908, Mariehamn – 28 November 1992,  Quarteira) was a Finnish film actor, director, writer and producer. He was the father of comedic actor Ville-Veikko Salminen and cinematographer Timo Salminen. Salminen was also a painter and drew complete storyboards of his films before he began shooting.

Salminen's film Kaks' tavallista Lahtista was nominated for the Golden Bear at the 1960 Berlin International Film Festival.

Filmography

Director
Lumikki ja 7 jätkää (1953)
Pekka Puupää (1953)
Säkkijärven polkka (1956)
Evakko (1956)
Kaks' tavallista Lahtista (1960)

Actor
Aktivistit (1939)
Herra ja ylhäisyys (1944)
 Cross of Love (1946)
Kalle-Kustaa Korkin seikkailut (1949)
Laivan kannella (1954)
Wonderman (1979)

References

External links
 

1908 births
1992 deaths
People from Mariehamn
People from Turku and Pori Province (Grand Duchy of Finland)
Finnish film directors
Finnish film producers
20th-century Finnish male actors